La Verne is an under construction light rail station in the Los Angeles Metro Rail system. It is currently under construction as part of the Foothill Extension and is slated to open in 2025. It will be served by the A Line.

The station is located near the intersection of Arrow Highway and E Street along the Pasadena Subdivision right of way in La Verne, California. The University of La Verne is northeast of the station, and Fairplex is one block to the south.

References

External links
La Verne station – Metro Gold Line Foothill Extension Construction Authority

Future Los Angeles Metro Rail stations
Railway stations scheduled to open in 2025
La Verne, California
Railway stations in California at university and college campuses